John Thomas "Doc" Wright (January 8, 1921 – July 24, 2008) was an American professional basketball player. He played in the National Basketball League for the Youngstown Bears in two games during the 1945–46 season and averaged 5.5 points per game. Some sources indicate that he played at George Washington University, but GWU's all-time letter winners records do not include him.

References

1921 births
2008 deaths
American men's basketball players
United States Navy personnel of World War II
Basketball players from Indiana
Guards (basketball)
Military personnel from Indiana
Paterson Crescents players
People from Henry County, Indiana
Youngstown Bears players